Spergularia rupicola is a species of flowering plant belonging to the family Caryophyllaceae.

It is native to Western Europe.

References

rupicola